Article 25 is a UK-based international NGO and registered charity that manages sustainable architecture projects in areas of extreme poverty and disaster. Article 25 works with other INGO partners to design and deliver hospitals, schools and homes, increasing and improving access to healthcare, education and adequate housing for some of the world's most vulnerable societies across the globe.

History
Established in 2005 by Maxwell Hutchinson, the name makes reference to the principle of the 25th Article of the Universal Declaration of Human Rights that safe and adequate shelter is a fundamental human right.  Caught up in the Indian Ocean tsunami in 2004, architect Maxwell Hutchinson recognised the potential impact the built environment could have on saving lives and preventing natural hazards from turning into full-blown disasters. Since it was formed, Article 25 has been governed by a distinguished trustee board including three RIBA Presidents, Maxwell Hutchinson, Sunand Prassad and Jack Pringle. The Patron of Article 25 is Norman Foster, a key figure in British modernist architecture.

Activity
Article 25’s projects range from one-off building projects for community-based organisations to large master planning projects for international organisations, including technical consultancy services for NGOs who have little access to vital design expertise.  It has worked with governments, NGOs and relief organisations on reconstruction projects including schools in Haiti, hurricane resistant homes in Dominica, and earthquake resistant homes in Pakistan. 

Some of the completed projects include an award-winning earthquake resistant housing programme in Northern Pakistan with Muslim Aid which received the 2009 Asia-Pacific Urban Land Award, and an award-nominated school for street children in Goa, India, with El Shaddai Street Child Rescue. The charity has delivered over 95 projects in 34 countries across five continents.

In 2022, Article 25's Collège Amadou Hampaté Bâ project in Niamey, Niger was named as one of Architonic's Projects of the Year. The project was credited for using low-carbon local materials and for the charity's work to train local masons.

References

External links
Article-25
Designbuild - Article 25 builds school in Niamey, Niger
ArchDaily - College Amadou Hampaté Bâ / Article 25
Designbuild - Network interview with Article-25
Architects Journal - Artwork auction raises £100k for architectural charity, Article 25

Architecture organisations based in the United Kingdom
Organizations established in 2005
2005 establishments in the United Kingdom